Mameigwess Lake is an irregularly-shaped lake in the north of the Unorganized Part of Kenora District in northwestern Ontario, Canada. The lake is in the Hudson Bay drainage basin.

The only named inflow is Michikenopik Creek at the southwest corner of the lake; there are numerous other unnamed inflows. The primary outflow is a channel, at the northwest, to Fishbasket Lake, which flows via the Fishbasket River, Winisk Lake, and the Winisk River to Hudson Bay.

References

Lakes of Kenora District